Judge Shelby may refer to:

Anthony B. Shelby (1789–1851), justice of the Supreme Court of the Republic of Texas
David Davie Shelby (1847–1914), judge of the United States Court of Appeals for the Fifth Circuit and the United States Circuit Courts for the Fifth Circuit
Robert J. Shelby (born 1970), judge of the United States District Court for the District of Utah